Michael Joseph Griffin (March 20, 1865 – April 10, 1908) was an American Major League Baseball center fielder who was born in Utica, New York. He played in 1,511 games over 12 seasons for teams in the American Association, Players' League, and National League. He had 1,755 hits, resulting in a .296 batting average, and was a prolific base stealer who swiped 473 bases during his career. In his last year in the majors, he was also a player-manager for the Brooklyn Bridegrooms.

Career
While playing for the local Utica professional team, Griffin was scouted and signed by Billy Barnie of the Baltimore Orioles. On April 16, 1887, he became the first major league player to hit a home run in his first plate appearance, an honor he shares with George Tebeau, who homered on the exact same day in his first plate appearance (it is unclear which player hit his home run first, chronologically, so both are considered "the first"). Griffin went on to become one of the premiere ballplayers of the time, leading his league in runs scored in 1889 and doubles in 1891. 

Griffin was team captain of Bridegrooms in 1897 and 1898 and served as interim manager for a part of 1898, a total of four games, winning one. After the 1898 season, Brooklyn signed him to a $3,500 contract to manage the following season. But before the season started, Brooklyn and Baltimore merged, and Baltimore manager Ned Hanlon was named Brooklyn's manager instead. Griffin was offered a $2,800 contract to play by Brooklyn, but he refused to sign. Brooklyn released him to the Cleveland Spiders, who then released him to the St. Louis Perfectos. After failing to receive a contract he felt he was worth from any team, he sued Brooklyn for the salary he believed they owed him from the contract he had signed and won a judgment of $2,300 from the club. He then unofficially retired from major league baseball.

Griffin returned to Utica where he became involved in the management of local breweries. It was there that he died from pneumonia, at age 43, and was buried at St. Agnes Cemetery.

See also
List of Major League Baseball career runs scored leaders
List of Major League Baseball career triples leaders
List of Major League Baseball career stolen bases leaders
List of Major League Baseball annual runs scored leaders
List of Major League Baseball annual doubles leaders
List of Major League Baseball players with a home run in their first major league at bat
List of Major League Baseball player-managers

References

External links

SABR Biography

1865 births
1908 deaths
19th-century baseball players
Major League Baseball center fielders
Major League Baseball player-managers
Baltimore Orioles (AA) players
Philadelphia Athletics (PL) players
Brooklyn Grooms players
Brooklyn Bridegrooms players
Brooklyn Bridegrooms managers
Syracuse Stars (minor league baseball) players
Utica Pent Ups players
Baseball players from New York (state)
Sportspeople from Utica, New York